Péter Szilágyi (28 May 1954 – 30 May 2013) was a Hungarian music conductor and politician, member of the National Assembly (MP) for Berettyóújfalu (Hajdú-Bihar County Constituency V) between 1994 and 2002. He was a member of the Committee on Education and Science.

Szilágyi died on 30 May 2013 at the age of 59.

References

1954 births
2013 deaths
Hungarian conductors (music)
Hungarian male musicians
Male conductors (music)
Hungarian Socialist Party politicians
Members of the National Assembly of Hungary (1994–1998)
Members of the National Assembly of Hungary (1998–2002)
People from Berettyóújfalu